Fairyland is a live album by jazz guitarist Larry Coryell. All songs were recorded on June 18, 1971 at the Montreux Jazz Festival in Switzerland and originally released by Mega Records on their Flying Dutchman Series. Coryell is accompanied by Chuck Rainey on bass and Bernard Purdie on drums.

Track listing

Personnel
 Larry Coryell – guitar, vocals
 Chuck Rainey – bass
 Bernard Purdie – drums

References

1971 live albums
Mega Records live albums
Flying Dutchman Records live albums
Larry Coryell albums
Albums produced by Bob Thiele
Albums recorded at the Montreux Jazz Festival